From Gardens Where We Feel Secure is the debut album by English musician Virginia Astley, issued on 29 July 1983 on her own label Happy Valley Records and distributed by Rough Trade Records.

The album is an instrumental collection of tone poems that describe the cycle and mirror the moods of an "indolent" summer day. It is notable for its structure, moving from dawn to dusk, and its use of natural sound effects, over which co-producer Russell Webb recorded Astley's improvised playing.

From Gardens Where We Feel Secure peaked at number four on the UK Independent Albums chart. Prior to the album's release, two of its tracks, "A Summer Long Since Past" and "It's Too Hot to Sleep", were issued on the 12" edition of Astley's single "Love's a Lonely Place to Be".

Astley later re-recorded "A Summer Long Since Past" for her 1986 album Hope in a Darkened Heart. From Gardens Where We Feel Secure was remastered and reissued by Happy Valley and Rough Trade as a CD in 2003.

An alternate cover shows a photograph of Cowleaze Wood covered in bluebells, a 70-acre woodland in the Chiltern Hills, England.

Critical reception

Stewart Mason, writing for AllMusic, stated:

Track listing
All tracks are written by Virginia Astley.

Side one ("Morning")
 "With My Eyes Wide Open I'm Dreaming" – 5:43
 "A Summer Long Since Past" – 4:36
 "From Gardens Where We Feel Secure" – 3:59
 "Hiding in the Ha-Ha" – 3:55

Side two ("Afternoon")
 "Out on the Lawn I Lie in Bed" – 5:09
 "Too Bright for Peacocks" – 2:29
 "Summer of Their Dreams" – 3:21
 "When the Fields Were on Fire" – 3:25
 "It's Too Hot to Sleep" – 5:18

Charts

References

1983 debut albums
Virginia Astley albums
Rough Trade Records albums